Gold Creek is an extinct town in Elko County, Nevada, United States.

History
A post office was established at Gold Creek in 1897, and remained in operation until 1929. The community was named for gold placer deposits near the original town site.

See also
 List of ghost towns in Nevada

References

External links

Ghost towns in Elko County, Nevada